The 2020 Alabama Crimson Tide softball team represents the University of Alabama in the 2020 NCAA Division I softball season. The Crimson Tide play their home games at Rhoads Stadium.

Previous season

The Crimson Tide finished the 2019 season 60–10 overall, and 18–6 in the SEC to finish first in the conference. The Crimson Tide hosted both a Regional and Super Regional during the  2019 NCAA Division I softball tournament and advanced to the Women's College World Series. The Crimson Tide were defeated by Oklahoma in the WCWS semifinals.

Preseason

SEC preseason poll
The SEC preseason poll was released on January 15, 2020.

Schedule and results

The season was cancelled ending on March 12, 2020.

Source:
*Rankings are based on the team's current ranking in the NFCA poll.

Rankings

References

Alabama
Alabama Crimson Tide softball seasons
Alabama Crimson Tide softball